The classification of minerals is a process of determining to which of several groups minerals belong based on their chemical characteristics. Since the 1950s, this classification has been carried out by the International Mineralogical Association, which classifies minerals into the following broad classes:

Classification of non-silicate minerals
Classification of silicate minerals
Classification of organic minerals

See also
 List of minerals

External links